The Marvelous Missing Link: Lost is the thirteenth studio album by Insane Clown Posse. It is the first part of the 3rd Joker Card in the second Deck of the Dark Carnival Saga. It was released on April 28, 2015 on Psychopathic Records via Sony's RED Distribution, three months before the release of its companion album Found. It is the group's 34th overall release.

Singles
The first single, entitled "Vomit", was released on April 7, 2015. People who preordered the album digitally received the single free. The second single was "Explosions", and was accompanied by a music video on May 14, 2015.

The third single titled "Falling Apart" was released March 9, 2016 and was accompanied by a music video released worldwide via Billboard.com. On April 22, 2016 ICP released the fourth single "I See The Devil" and was accompanied by a music video.

Music videos
On April 28, 2015 press release for The Marvelous Missing Link: Lost it was stated that the first music video will be shot sometime in the upcoming week. On a segment of Sugar Slam's "Rock It Or Sock It" show on April 30, 2015 on Psychopathic Radio, Psychopathic producer Kuma announced that they have shot a video for the song "Explosions" and will be released sometime later this month. The music video was released on May 14, 2015. It was also co-released on Vice.com, exclusively for only 24 hours, as reported in the May 9, 2015 edition of the Hatchet Herald.

On March 9, 2016 the second music video for "Falling Apart" debuted worldwide via Billboard.com. On April 22, 2016 the third music video was released for the song "I See The Devil".

Commercial performance
The album debuted at number 17 on the Billboard 200, selling 18,000 copies in its first week. ICP won album of the week by vintagevynilnews.com, by being the highest ranking veteran artist.

Release
The album was released on April 28, 2015. It peaked at #17 on the Billboard 200, number 2 on the Independent charts, and number 2 on the Rap charts. On June 16, 2015 with the posting of the 2015 Gathering program on juggalogathering.com, it was announced that both Lost and Found would be released on a 4 LP vinyl set on September 18, 2015. On October 2, 2015 the left over songs from both albums were released as The Marvelous Missing Link: Outtakes.

Track listing

The Marvelous Missing Link: Outtakes
(songs in bold are left over from The Marvelous Missing Link: Lost)

Personnel

Vocals, lyrics
 Violent J - Vocals, lyrics
 Shaggy 2 Dope - Vocals, lyrics
 Otis/Young Wicked - Additional lyrics
 Big Hoodoo - Additional Background vocals
 Jumpsteady - Lyrics/vocals on "Intro", additional background vocals
 Sugar Slam - Additional background vocals
 Chop - Additional background vocals
 Mean Dean - Additional background vocals
 J-Webb - Additional background vocals
 Ominous The Klown - Additional background vocals

Production
 Otis/Young Wicked - Production (1,7,10,11,13)
 Mike P. - Production (2,5,6,8)
 Michael "Seven" Summers - Production (3,4,9,14)
 Brian Kuma - Production (12)

Chart positions

References

2015 albums
Albums produced by Mike Puwal
Albums produced by Seven (record producer)
Insane Clown Posse albums
Psychopathic Records albums